Colombina is a stock character and Harlequin's mistress

Colombina may also refer to:

 Colombina Parra (born 1970), Chilean musician
 Colombina, a fictional character from Pinocchio (2019 film)
 Institución Colombina (Colombina Institute), Seville, Spain; an administrative unit of several libraries and archives
 La Colombina, a library administered by the institute
 La Colombina, a band founded by Josep Cabré
 Colombina, the dove-shaped rocket traditionally fired in Florence, Italy; see Traditions of Italy

See also

 
 Columbina (disambiguation)
 Columbine (disambiguation) 
 Columbian (disambiguation) 
 Columbiana (disambiguation) 
 Columbia (disambiguation) 
 Columbiad (disambiguation)
 Colombine (disambiguation)
 Colombino (disambiguation) 
 Colombian (disambiguation) 
 Colombiana (disambiguation) 
 Colombia (disambiguation)